Talineh-ye Dudera (also Romanized as Ţalīneh-ye Dūderā’) is a village in Dudera Rural District of Rudasht District, Lordegan County, Chaharmahal and Bakhtiari province, Iran. At the 2006 census, its population was 288 in 49 households. The following census in 2011 counted 250 people in 45 households. The latest census in 2016 showed a population of 284 people in 60 households; it was the largest village in its rural district. The village is populated by Lurs.

References 

Lordegan County

Populated places in Chaharmahal and Bakhtiari Province

Populated places in Lordegan County

Luri settlements in Chaharmahal and Bakhtiari Province